This is a list of civil parishes in the ceremonial county of Suffolk, England. There are 479 civil parishes.

Babergh
The whole of the district is parished.

Formerly Forest Heath (West Suffolk)
The whole of the district is parished.

Other Districts
Ipswich is unparished. Population figures are unavailable for some of the smallest parishes.

See also
 List of civil parishes in England

References

External links
 Office for National Statistics : Geographical Area Listings

Civil parishes
Suffolk
 
Civil parishes